Hilary Kole is an American jazz singer.

Career
Kole's father, Robert, performed on Broadway during the 1950s in the musicals Plain and Fancy, Wonderful Town, and West Side Story. When she was nineteen, she attended the Manhattan School of Music. While she was a student, she sang in front of a big band six nights a week at the Rainbow Room, singing standards from the Great American Songbook. After the Rainbow Room, she sang at the Blue Note, Birdland, and the Algonquin Hotel. Her debut album, Haunted Heart (2009), was produced by jazz guitarist John Pizzarelli.

Kole participated in a concert at Carnegie Hall in 2007 that honored Oscar Peterson. She sang and co-wrote two Frank Sinatra revues, and she toured covering the songs of Judy Garland. In 2016, she released the album The Judy Garland Project, produced by Richard Barone.

Her album You Are There contains duets with Dave Brubeck, Alan Broadbent, Monty Alexander, Kenny Barron, Freddy Cole, Benny Green, Hank Jones, Steve Kuhn, Michel Legrand, Mike Renzi and Cedar Walton.

Discography
 Haunted Heart (Justin Time, 2009)
 You Are There (Justin Time, 2010)
 Moments Like This (2011)
 A Self-Portrait (Miranda Music, 2014)
 The Judy Garland Project (Miranda Music, 2016)

References

External links
 
 Official site

American women jazz singers
American jazz singers
Manhattan School of Music alumni
Justin Time Records artists